Vilhelm Bryde (8 April 1888 – 24 April 1974) was a Swedish actor, film producer, and art director.

Biography
From 1909 to 1911, he was a student at Dramaten. Bryde was an actor at Svenska Teatern in Stockholm (1913-1919).  He was director of the  Svensk Filmindustri facilities at the Filmstaden (1922-1933). He worked on the 1924 Greta Garbo film The Saga of Gosta Berling, part-designing the forty eight sets constructed for Filmstaden at Råsunda for the production.

Selected filmography

Art director
 Thora van Deken (1920)
 A Fortune Hunter (1921)
 Boman at the Exhibition (1923)
 Johan Ulfstjerna (1923)
Charles XII's Courier (1924)
 The Saga of Gosta Berling (1924)
 Life in the Country (1924)
 Charles XII (1925)
 Where the Lighthouse Flashes (1924)
 40 Skipper Street (1925)
 The Lady of the Camellias (1925)
 First Mate Karlsson's Sweethearts (1925)
 Ingmar's Inheritance (1925)
 Her Little Majesty (1925)
 A Sister of Six (1926)
 To the Orient (1926)
 She Is the Only One (1926)
 The Tales of Ensign Stål (1926)
 The Million Dollars (1926)
 The Rivals (1926)
 The Ghost Baron (1927)
 Sealed Lips (1927)
 Sin (1928)
 Jansson's Temptation (1928)
 Black Rudolf (1928)
 Say It with Music (1929)
 Artificial Svensson (1929)
 The Realm of the Rye (1929)
 The Strongest (1929)
 Father and Son (1930)
 Cavaliers of the Crown (1930)
 Frida's Songs (1930)
 Ulla, My Ulla (1930)
 The People of Norrland (1930)
 The Red Day (1931)
 The Girl from Värmland (1931)
 The False Millionaire (1931)
 Colourful Pages (1931)

Director
 A Perfect Gentleman (1927)

Producer
 Sin (1928)
 The Triumph of the Heart (1929)
 Artificial Svensson (1929)
 Frida's Songs (1930)

References

Bibliography
 Payne, Robert  (2002) The Great Garbo  ( New York City: Cooper Square Press)

External links

1888 births
1974 deaths
Male actors from Stockholm
Swedish male film actors
Swedish male silent film actors
20th-century Swedish male actors
Swedish art directors